Sebastian Brandner (born 8 February 1983) is an Austrian goalkeeper coach, currently for SC Rheindorf Altach, and former footballer.

References

Austrian footballers
Austrian Football Bundesliga players
1983 births
Living people
SC Rheindorf Altach players
Association football goalkeepers
People from Bludenz
Footballers from Vorarlberg